This is a list of defunct airlines of Democratic Republic of the Congo .

See also

 List of airlines of the Democratic Republic of the Congo
 List of airports in the Democratic Republic of the Congo

References

Congo Democratic Republic
Airlines